Nidi railway station is a railway station on the Panvel–Roha route of Central Railway in India. It is at a distance of 139.43 km from Chhatrapati Shivaji Terminus via . Its station code is NIDI. It belongs to the Mumbai division of Central Railway.

The station is situated in Raigad district of Maharashtra. It is situated between Nagothane railway station and Roha railway station.

On 4 May 2014, a train derailed near here killing at least 18 people and injuring 125 others.

References

Railway stations in Raigad district
Mumbai Suburban Railway stations
Panvel-Roha rail line